Fort Riverview is a historic archaeological site located near Madison Heights, Amherst County, Virginia.  It is an American Civil War redoubt built by the Confederate States Army about 1863 to protect Six Mile Bridge and the James River and Kanawha Canal system along the James River. Fort Riverview served as part of the outer defense system for Lynchburg, Virginia. The protection of this bridge was vital to the Confederacy as it carried supplies for General Robert E. Lee.  Since Lynchburg served as a major supply, staging, and hospital center, Fort Riverview was strategically located to protect this critical center.

It was added to the National Register of Historic Places in 1989.

References

American Civil War sites
Archaeological sites on the National Register of Historic Places in Virginia
National Register of Historic Places in Amherst County, Virginia
American Civil War on the National Register of Historic Places